
Year 312 (CCCXII) was a leap year starting on Tuesday (link will display the full calendar) of the Julian calendar. In the Roman Empire, it was known as the Year of the Consulship of Constantinus and Licinianus (or, less frequently, year 1065 Ab urbe condita). The denomination 312 for this year has been used since the early medieval period, when the Anno Domini calendar era became the prevalent method in Europe for naming years.

Events 
 By place 

 Roman Empire 
 Constantine I crosses the Cottian Alps with an army (40,000 men) and defeats Maxentius's generals in three battles at Turin, Brescia and Verona. Maxentius's Praetorian Prefect Ruricius Pompeianus is killed in the fighting outside Verona.
 October 28 – Battle of the Milvian Bridge: Constantine defeats Maxentius at the Milvian Bridge, becoming the only Roman emperor in the West. Prior to the battle, he reportedly has a vision of a cross (labarum) with the phrase "in hoc signo vinces" ("In this sign you shall conquer"). This encourages him to convert to Christianity.
 October 29 – Constantine enters Rome; he stages a grand adventus in the city, and is met with popular jubilation. Maxentius' body is fished out of the Tiber and decapitated.
 Constantine forges an alliance with co-emperor Licinius, and offers him his half-sister, Constantia, in marriage. The Praetorian Guard and Imperial Horse Guard (equites singulares Augusti) are disbanded.
 Emperor Maximinus Daza campaigns unsuccessfully against the Armenians.

 By topic 

 Religion 
 Constantine I adopts the words "in hoc signo vinces" as a motto, and has the letters X and P (the first letters of the Greek word Christ) emblazoned on the shields of his soldiers.
 The Council of Carthage supports Donatism, which espouses a rigorous application and interpretation of the sacraments. These doctrines will be condemned by the Council of Arles (314).
 Constantine I promotes a policy of state sponsorship of Christianity, perhaps even becoming a Christian himself (see Constantine the Great and Christianity).

Births 
 Dao'an, Chinese Buddhist monk and writer (d. 385)
 Huan Wen (or Yuanzi), Chinese general (d. 373)

Deaths 
 October 28 – Maxentius, Roman emperor (b. 283)
 Clement of Ancyra, Christian bishop and martyr
 Guo Xiang, Chinese scholar and philosopher (b. 252)
 Huyan, Chinese empress of the Xiongnu state
 Ruricius Pompeianus, Roman praetorian prefect

References